Emanuel Leone Moura (born 1 November 1999), commonly known as Emanuel, is a Brazilian professional footballer who plays as a centre-back for Spartak Varna.

Club career

Grêmio
Born in São Paulo, Emanuel joined the Grêmio's Academy at the age of 16 in 2016.

Spartak Varna
On 20 June 2022 Emanuel Moura joined the newly promoted to the Bulgarian First League team Spartak Varna, signing a 3-years long contract deal. He made his league debut for the team on 16 September 2022, ina match against Botev Plovdiv helping the team to secure their first win for the season.

Career statistics

Club

International

Honours
Grêmio
Copa CONMEBOL Libertadores: 2017
CONMEBOL Recopa Sudamericana: 2018
Campeonato Gaúcho: 2018, 2019, 2020, 2021
Recopa Gaúcha: 2019, 2021

References

External links

Profile at the Grêmio F.B.P.A. website

1999 births
Living people
Footballers from São Paulo
Brazilian footballers
Association football defenders
Campeonato Brasileiro Série A players
Desportivo Brasil players
Grêmio Foot-Ball Porto Alegrense players
PFC Spartak Varna players